Honecker is a German surname. Notable people with the surname include:

 Martin Honecker (1888–1941), German philosopher & psychologist
 Erich Honecker (1912–1994), German Communist politician
 Margot Honecker (1927–2016), German Communist politician & political-family member

German-language surnames